Tina Aeberli (born 1989 in Zurich) is a Footbag player from Switzerland.

Career 
Tina Aeberli is the most successful female footbag player so far. The student of human medicine discovered the footbag game for herself at the age of 13 in a sports holiday camp in Switzerland. One year later in 2004 she became 4th at her very first Swiss Championship. Since 2005 Aeberli has practically been unbeaten in the ladies' tournament and has achieved more than 35 single titles; she has also been eight times European Champion and six  times World Champion. Because of her great technical superiority she is increasingly participating at the men's events. Since 2006, she is a member of the Big Add Posse. The Big ADD Posse (BAP) are a group of skilled freestyle footbag players who have contributed to the progression of the sport in a unique way. The group is invite-only, and the only way to get an invitation is to shred hard in front of other members and prove your style.

Titles 
Swiss Champion (only main discipline):
1. Place Routines (2005, 2006, 2007, 2008, 2009, 2010, 2011, 2012)

European Champion (only main discipline):
1. Place Routines (2005, 2006, 2007, 2008, 2009, 2010, 2011, 2012)

World Champion (only main discipline):
1. Place Routines (2006, 2007, 2008, 2009, 2010, 2012)
1. Place Women’s Doubles with Lena Scheiwiller (2005, 2006)

References

External links 
 Website of Tina Aeberli
 Fan site of Tina Aeberli
 Video site of Tina Aeberli
 Website of Big Add Posse

1989 births
Living people
Swiss-German people
Swiss footbag players
Sportspeople from Zürich